Stepping Hill is an electoral ward in the Metropolitan Borough of Stockport. It elects three Councillors to Stockport Metropolitan Borough Council using the first past the post electoral method, electing one Councillor every year without election on the fourth.

The ward is bordered by Hazel Grove, Bramhall North, Davenport & Cale Green, Manor and Offerton. Located within the ward is Stepping Hill Hospital, which is Stockport's only hospital and treats over 500,000 patients a year.
Together with Bramhall North, Bramhall South, Cheadle and Gatley, Cheadle Hulme North, Cheadle Hulme South, and Heald Green wards it makes up the Cheadle Parliamentary Constituency.

Councillors
Stepping Hill electoral ward is represented in Westminster by Mary Robinson MP for Cheadle.

The ward is represented on Stockport Council by three councillors:

 Christine Carrigan (Labour Co-op)
 Grace Baynham (Lib Dem)
 Rory Leonard (Labour)

 indicates seat up for re-election.
 indicates seat won in by-election.

Elections in the 2010s

May 2021

May 2019

May 2018

May 2016

May 2015

May 2014

May 2012

May 2011

References

External links
Stockport Metropolitan Borough Council

Wards of the Metropolitan Borough of Stockport